The Kawasaki Z series is a family of standard/naked bikes manufactured by Kawasaki since 1972.

Single cylinder 
 Z200/KZ200 (1977-1984)
 Z125 (2018–present)
 Z125 PRO (2015–present)
 Z250SL (2014–present)

Parallel-twin 
 Z250 (2013–present)
 Z300 (2014–2018)
 Z400/KZ400 (1974–1984)
 Z400 (2018–present)
 Z650 (2017–present)
 Z750 twin (1976–1976)

Inline-four 
 Z400-J/KZ400-J (1980–1983)
 Z500/Z550 (1979–1985)
 Z650 (1976–1983)
 Z750/Z2 (1973–1978)
 Z750 (2004–2013)
 Z800 (2013–2016)
 Z900 (2017–present)
 Z900RS/Z900RS CAFE (2018–present)
 Z1 (1972–1975)
 Z900/KZ900 (1976–1977)
 Z1000/KZ1000 (1977–2005)
 Z1000 (2003–2016)
 Z1100 (1980–1986)
 Z H2 (2020–2021)

Inline-six 
 Z1300 (1979–1989)

See also 
 Kawasaki KZ750 (1976–1987)
 Kawasaki Zephyr (1989–2000)
 Kawasaki ZRX1100 (1997–2005)
 Kawasaki ZRX1200R (2001–2008)
 Kawasaki ZR-7 (1999–2005)
 Kawasaki GPZ series (1981–2009)
 Kawasaki Ninja (ZX, ZX-R, ZZR series, 1984–present)
 Kawasaki Eliminator (ZL series, 1985–2007)

Z series
Standard motorcycles